Tommy Abbott (November 4, 1934 – April 8, 1987) was an American-born actor, dancer, and choreographer best known for his role as Gee-Tar in the original production of West Side Story.  Abbott was for many years the assistant choreographer to Jerome Robbins.  He was the chief choreographer for the film version of Fiddler on the Roof.

Credits

Choreography 

 Fiddler on the Roof (1981) 
 West Side Story (1980)
 Fiddler on the Roof (1976)
 Fiddler on the Roof (1964) Assistant to Choreographer
 West Side Story (1964)

Stage management
 Tovarich (1963) Assistant to Stage Manager

Performer
 Fiddler on the Roof (1964) "Vladimir"
 A Family Affair (1962) Dancer
 West Side Story (1957) "Gee-Tar"

References

External links

1934 births
1987 deaths
Male actors from Texas
American male dancers
American male musical theatre actors
American male stage actors
People from Waco, Texas
Male actors from New York City
20th-century American male actors
Male actors from Waco, Texas
20th-century American singers
20th-century American dancers
20th-century American male singers